Ensar Brunčević ; born 13 February 1999) is a Serbian footballer who currently plays for Balestier Khalsa.

Career

Balestier Khalsa

He scored his 1st goal for the Tigers in the 2nd match of the season against Albirex Niigata (S).

As at 31 October 2020, all of Brunčević’s three goals this season have come inside the six-yard box.

Career statistics

Club

Notes

References

1999 births
Living people
Serbian footballers
Serbian expatriate footballers
Association football defenders
Singapore Premier League players
Balestier Khalsa FC players
Serbian expatriate sportspeople in Singapore